Players and pairs who neither have high enough rankings nor receive wild cards may participate in a qualifying tournament held one week before the annual Wimbledon Tennis Championships.

Seeds

  Michael Russell (first round)
  Cecil Mamiit (qualified)
  Alexandre Simoni (second round)
  Michaël Llodra (qualified)
  André Sá (qualifying competition, lucky loser)
  George Bastl (first round)
  Federico Luzzi (first round)
  Christian Vinck (second round)
  Sébastien Lareau (first round)
  Dick Norman (first round)
  Paradorn Srichaphan (qualifying competition, lucky loser)
  Bob Bryan (qualified)
  Neville Godwin (qualified)
  Fernando González (first round)
  Ivo Heuberger (qualified)
  Nicolas Coutelot (first round)
  Ota Fukárek (first round)
  Cyril Saulnier (second round)
  Taylor Dent (qualified)
  James Blake (first round)
  Jan Vacek (qualifying competition, lucky loser)
  Daniel Nestor (qualified)
  Irakli Labadze (second round)
  Kevin Kim (first round)
  Takao Suzuki (second round)
  Wayne Black (qualifying competition, lucky loser)
  Marc-Kevin Goellner (second round)
  Hugo Armando (second round)
  Axel Pretzsch (first round)
  Yoon Yong-il (qualified)
  Vincenzo Santopadre (first round)
  Julian Knowle (qualified)

Qualifiers

  Daniel Nestor
  Cecil Mamiit
  Yoon Yong-il
  Michaël Llodra
  Scott Draper
  Taylor Dent
  Leander Paes
  Stéphane Huet
  Luke Milligan
  Todd Woodbridge
  Julian Knowle
  Bob Bryan
  Neville Godwin
  Artem Derepasko
  Ivo Heuberger
  Fredrik Jonsson

Lucky losers

  André Sá
  Paradorn Srichaphan
  Jan Vacek
  Wayne Black
  Mardy Fish

Qualifying draw

First qualifier

Second qualifier

Third qualifier

Fourth qualifier

Fifth qualifier

Sixth qualifier

Seventh qualifier

Eighth qualifier

Ninth qualifier

Tenth qualifier

Eleventh qualifier

Twelfth qualifier

Thirteenth qualifier

Fourteenth qualifier

Fifteenth qualifier

Sixteenth qualifier

External links

 2001 Wimbledon Championships – Men's draws and results at the International Tennis Federation

Men's Singles Qualifying
Wimbledon Championship by year – Men's singles qualifying